The Bruce II Sports Centre is an indoor recreation complex located in Channel-Port aux Basques, Newfoundland and Labrador. The facility was opened on November 23, 1996, replacing the original Bruce Arena, which was destroyed in a fire on September 24, 1995.

In addition to ice hockey and figure skating, the Bruce II contains a five-pin bowling alley, swimming pool, curling rink, fitness area, and two meeting rooms.

External links
 

Sports venues in Newfoundland and Labrador
Indoor ice hockey venues in Canada
Indoor arenas in Newfoundland and Labrador